An azurophilic granule is a cellular object readily stainable with a Romanowsky stain.  In white blood cells and hyperchromatin, staining imparts a burgundy or merlot coloration. Neutrophils in particular are known for containing azurophils loaded with a wide variety of anti-microbial defensins that fuse with phagocytic vacuoles.  Azurophils may contain myeloperoxidase, phospholipase A2, acid hydrolases, elastase, defensins, neutral serine proteases, bactericidal/permeability-increasing protein,  lysozyme, cathepsin G, proteinase 3, and proteoglycans.

Azurophil granules are also known as "primary granules".

Furthermore, the term "azurophils" may refer to a unique type of cells, identified only in reptiles.  These cells are similar in size to so-called heterophils with abundant cytoplasm that is finely to coarsely granular and may sometimes contain vacuoles.  Granules may impart a purplish hue to the cytoplasm, particularly to the outer region.  Occasionally, azurophils are observed with vacuolated cytoplasm.

See also
 Azure A
 Azure (color)
 Granule
 Lysosome
 Specific granules
 Neutrophil degranulation

References

Hematology
Staining